Charles Herman Bronkie (August 6, 1884 – May 27, 1968) was a Major League Baseball third baseman who played for seven seasons. He played for the Cleveland Naps from 1910 to 1912, the Chicago Cubs in 1914, the St. Louis Cardinals in 1918, and the St. Louis Browns in 1919 and 1922. He attended Manchester High School.

References

External links

1884 births
1968 deaths
Cleveland Naps players
Chicago Cubs players
St. Louis Cardinals players
St. Louis Browns players
Major League Baseball third basemen
Waterbury Authors players
Hartford Senators players
Waterbury Invincibles players
Nashville Vols players
Toledo Mud Hens managers
Toledo Mud Hens players
Indianapolis Indians players
Waterbury Brasscos players
Sportspeople from Manchester, Connecticut